Can-avid (IPA: [ˌkɐnˈʔavɪd]), officially the Municipality of Can-avid, is a 4th class municipality in the province of Eastern Samar, Philippines. According to the 2020 census, it has a population of 21,682 people.

History
Can-avid was created in 1948 from the barrios of Can-avid, Carolina, Barok, Cansangaya, Mabuhay, Camantang, Canilay, Pandol and Balagon, formerly part of Dolores, Eastern Samar, by virtue of Republic Act No. 264.

Geography

Barangays
Can-avid is politically subdivided into 28 barangays.

 Balagon
 Baruk
 Boco
 Caghalong
 Camantang
 Can-ilay
 Cansangaya
 Canteros
 Carolina
 Guibuangan
 Jepaco
 Mabuhay
 Malogo
 Obong
 Pandol
 Barangay 1 Poblacion
 Barangay 2 Poblacion
 Barangay 3 Poblacion
 Barangay 4 Poblacion
 Barangay 5 Poblacion
 Barangay 6 Poblacion
 Barangay 7 Poblacion
 Barangay 8 Poblacion
 Barangay 9 Poblacion
 Barangay 10 Poblacion
 Salvacion
 Solong
 Rawis

Climate

Demographics

Economy

References

External links
 [ Philippine Standard Geographic Code]
 Philippine Census Information
 Local Governance Performance Management System

Municipalities of Eastern Samar